The Abortion Rights Campaign (ARC) is an Irish abortion rights group. The group's goal is the introduction of free and legal abortion in Ireland and Northern Ireland. Prior to May 2018, the group campaigned for the repeal of the Eighth Amendment of the Irish Constitution, which was achieved with the passing of the Thirty-Sixth Amendment 2018. The ARC also campaigns for the Northern Ireland Assembly on behalf of abortion legislation and "to ensure the health of women in pregnancy is protected in line with international human rights standards".

History
The Abortion Rights Campaign was founded by 40 people on 10 July 2012. Initially formed as the Irish Choice Network, after another meeting in the Gresham Hotel in Dublin on 8 December 2012 and another meeting on 19 January 2013 the Abortion Rights Campaign was formally launched. It has organised the annual March for Choice in Dublin since 2013.

Many Irish politicians have supported ARC's aims, such as Richard Boyd Barrett (Anti-Austerity Alliance–People Before Profit), Catherine Murphy (Social Democrats), Mick Wallace, Joan Collins and Clare Daly (Independents 4 Change). ARC is not affiliated with any political party.

ARC was one of the main partner organisations in Together for Yes, the civil society group advocating a Yes vote in the 2018 referendum. One of ARC's founding members was a co-director of Together for Yes. ARC's network of regional groups across the island of Ireland formed the basis for many Together for Yes groups in several counties in Ireland.

In January 2016, they received a grant of €23,000 from Open Society Foundations for "educational and stigma-busting projects." SIPO reasoned that the money had been raised for a political purpose. The ARC returned the money in November 2016, while disagreeing with the finding. The story was first published in The Irish Catholic in late March 2017.

Structure
ARC is an all-volunteer, non-hierarchical organisation. Membership elect a Convening Group annually, which convenes a Steering Group made up of representatives of several working groups and regional groups. Ongoing decision-making is carried out by the Steering Group during regular meetings. There is no one leader or spokesperson of ARC as the Convening and Working Group roles change on a regular basis. This structure is designed to encourage engagement and activity by all members, and to avoid power hierarchies.

March for Choice
The Abortion Rights Campaign's most visible event is the annual March for Choice, normally held on the Global Day of Action for Safe and Legal Access to Abortion. The March is organised by ARC and attended by the public, as well as various national abortion rights groups, including trade unions such as Unite, Mandate, Teachers Union of Ireland, National Union of Journalists and Union of Students in Ireland, political parties including Labour, Solidarity–People Before Profit, and the Social Democrats, and international groups such as Catholics for Choice.

The most recent March for Choice was held on 29 September 2018, the first since the vote to repeal the Eighth Amendment. The theme was 'Free Safe Legal', the slogan of ARC, and was chosen to "show [their] support for stigma-free abortion access for anyone who wants or needs one, regardless of their financial or legal status".

Speakers included ARC co-conveners Sarah Monaghan and Denise O'Toole, Zanele Sibindi of Movement of Asylum Seekers in Ireland, Evie Nevin of Disabled People for Choice and Emma Campbell and Kellie O'Dowd from the Belfast-based Alliance for Choice.

The 2017 March for Choice was held on 30 September and over 40,000 people took part. The rally at the march's conclusion was addressed by Bernadette Devlin McAliskey.  Additional "sympathy marches" were held in 20 cities around the world, including London, Sydney and Nicosia.

References

External links
 

2012 establishments in Ireland
Abortion-rights organisations in Ireland